The 1987 Gran Premio Fortuna was the opening round of the 1987 World Sports-Prototype Championship.  It took place at the Circuito Permanente Del Jarama, Spain on March 22, 1987.

Official results
Class winners in bold.  Cars failing to complete 75% of the winner's distance marked as Not Classified (NC).

Statistics
 Pole Position - #4 Silk Cut Jaguar - 1:14.541
 Fastest Lap - #17 Rothmans Porsche - 1:17.871
 Average Speed - 144.464 km/h

References

 
 

Jarama
Jarama
1000 km Jarama